Robertdale Rulon Crow Jr. (born February 21, 1971) is an American singer and musician from San Diego, California, known for his involvement with the bands Pinback, Heavy Vegetable, Physics, Optiganally Yours and Thingy. He has also led the bands Advertising, Alpha Males, Altron Tube, Byre, Cthugha, Fantasy Mission Force, Goblin Cock, Holy Smokes, the Ladies, Other Men, and Remote Action Sequence Project, as well as performing and releasing solo records under his own name and under the name Snotnose.

Discography

Solo 

 The 1995 Lesser Rob Crow Split CD (1995) (split with Lesser)
 Lactose Adept (1996)
 My Room Is a Mess (2003)
 Not Making Any Friends Here... Volume 1 EP (2006)
 Living Well (2007)
 He Thinks He's People (2011)
 Everything's OK: Season 1 Original Soundtrack (2018)
 Everybody's Got Damage: Acoustic Covers In Isolation (2020)
 An EP of Acoustic Iron Maiden Covers (2020) (featuring Kavus Torabi and Mike Vennart)
 The "You're Doomed. Be Nice." Demos (2021)

Anal Trump 

 That Makes Me Smart! (2016)
 To All the Broads I've Nailed Before (2017)
 If You Thought Six Million Jews Was A Lot Of People, You Should've Seen My Inauguration (2017)
 If You Wanted To Qualify For Health Insurance, Then Maybe You Shouldn't Have Gotten Raped? (2017)
 Make America Say Merry Christmas Again (2017)
 The First 100 Songs compilation (2018)

Byre 

 Here In Dead Lights (2018)

Fantasy Mission Force 

 Circus Atari EP (1997)

Goblin Cock 

 Goblin Cock discography

Heavy Vegetable 

 Heavy Vegetable discography

Holy Smokes 

 Talk To Your Kids About Gangs (2006)

The Ladies 

 They Mean Us (2006)

Optiganally Yours 

 Spotlight On Optiganally Yours (1997)
 Presents: Exclusively Talentmaker! (2000)
 O.Y. In Hi-Fi (2018)

Other Men 

 Wake Up Swimming (2007)
 For the Purposes of This Conversation (2018) (as Other)

Physics 

 Physics² (1998)
 2.7.98 (2001)
 1999-11-21 (2002)
 ³ (2018)

PLOSIVS 

 Plosivs (2022)

Pinback 

 Pinback discography

Rob Crow's Gloomy Place 

 You're Doomed. Be Nice. (2016)

Remote Action Sequence Project 

 Remote Action Sequence Project cassette (1995)
 The Semi-Glorified Demos of Remote Action Sequence Project (2018)

Snotnose 

 A Distraction (2018)

Thingy 

 Thingy discography

Third Act Problems 

 The Sun Setting Over the Argosy Book Store (2018)

Guest appearances 

 Boilermaker – Boilermaker EP (1993) (guitar/vocals)
 Boilermaker – Drained Nonsense EP (1993) (guitar/vocals)
 Drive Like Jehu – Yank Crime (1994) (vocals on "Luau")
 Creedle – When the Wind Blows (1996) (vocals)
 Team Sleep – Team Sleep (2005) (vocals)
 Sleeping People – Growing (2007) (vocals on "People Staying Awake")
 Prefuse 73 – Rivington Não Rio (2015) ("Quiet One")
 Nick Prol & The Proletarians – Loon Attic (2017) (guitar/backing vocals on "Beekeeper's Suit")
 Tera Melos – "Lemon Grove" (2018) (words and voice)
 Hot Snakes – Jericho Sirens (2018)

References

External links 
 Interview at Copacetic
 Rob Crow at Temporary Residence Limited
  <<<pinback>>>
 Optiganally Yours
 Living Well Reviews at Metacritic
 Rob Crow interview at Silent Uproar
 Rob Crow project list at Functionbad.com

1971 births
Living people
American indie rock musicians
Musicians from San Diego
Pinback members
People from Encinitas, California
21st-century American singers
21st-century American male singers
Temporary Residence Limited artists
Joyful Noise Recordings artists
Absolutely Kosher Records artists